Avi is a given name, usually masculine, often a diminutive of Avram, Avraham, etc. It is sometimes feminine and a diminutive of the Hebrew spelling of Abigail.

People with the given name include:

 Avi (born 1937), Newbery award-winning American author 
 Avi Arad (born 1948), Israeli-American businessman, founder, chairman and CEO of Marvel Studios
 Avi Avital (born 1978), Israeli mandolin player and composer
 Avi Beker (1952–2015), Israel-American political scientist
 Avi Bell, Professor of Law at the University of San Diego School of Law and Bar-Ilan University Faculty of Law
 Avi Ben-Chimol (born 1985), Israeli basketball player
 Avi Cohen (1956–2010), Israeli footballer
 Avi Cohen (footballer, born 1962), Israeli former footballer
 Avi Dichter (born 1952), Israeli politician, former Minister of Internal Security, Minister of Home Front Defense and Shin Bet director 
 Avi Gabai (born 1967), Israeli politician, former Minister of Environmental Protection (2015-2016)
 Avi Ivgi (born 1978), Israeli football goalkeeper
 Avi Kornick (born 1983), Israeli actor
 Avi Kaplan (born 1989), American-Jewish a capella singer and songwriter
 Avi Lerner (born 1947), American-Israeli film producer
 Avi Lewis (born 1968), Canadian documentary filmmaker and former TV host
 Avi Nesher (born 1953), Israeli film producer, director, screenwriter and actor
 Avi Nimni (born 1972), Israeli former footballer
 Avi Pazner (born 1937), Israeli retired diplomat
 Avi Peretz (footballer) (born 1971), Israeli former footballer
 Avi Peretz (singer) (born 1966), Israeli singer in Mizrahi music tradition
 Avi Ran (1963–1987), Israeli footballer
 Avi Rikan (born 1988), Israeli footballer
 Avi Rubin (born 1967), American computer scientist and expert in systems and networking security
 Avi Sagild (1933–1995), Danish film actress
 Avi Schafer (born 1998), Japanese professional basketball player 
 Avi Shlaim (born 1945), Israeli-British professor and historian
 Avi Soffer (born 1986), Israeli footballer
 Avi Strool (born 1980), Israeli retired footballer
 Avi Tikva (born 1976), Israeli former footballer
 Avi Toledano (born 1948), Israeli singer and songwriter, runner-up in the 1982 Eurovision Song Contest
 Avi Wallerstein, Canadian ophthalmologist and laser eye surgeon, co-founder of LASIK MD
 Avi Weiss (born 1944), American rabbi, author, teacher, lecturer and activist
 Avi Wigderson (born 1956), Israeli mathematician and computer scientist
 Avi Wortzman (born 1970), Israeli politician, former  Deputy Minister of Education (2013-2014)
 Avi Yehezkel (born 1958), Israeli former politician
 Avi Yehiel (born 1979), Israeli footballer

Masculine given names
Hypocorisms